Live From Toronto is an EP by the Portland, Oregon band Everclear. It was released only in Japan. Recorded January 14, 1998 in Toronto, the entire set list was 12 songs long. Tracks 2, 4, 5, 6, and 8 were featured on a promo CD with certain editions of their 2000 release Songs from an American Movie Vol. One: Learning How to Smile.

Track listing
 "Everything to Everyone" - 3:20
 "Amphetamine" - 3:54
 "I Will Buy  You a New Life" - 4:43
 "Loser Makes Good" - 3:02
 "Heroin Girl" - 3:05
 "Normal Like You" - 3:10
 "Santa Monica" - 3:20
 "Local God" - 4:05

References

Everclear (band) albums
1998 live albums
1998 EPs
Live EPs